Yuksel Yumerov (first name spelt in Turkish as Yüksel) (born 16 October 1968) is a former Bulgarian footballer of Bulgarian-Turkish descent. Among his club teams are PFC Shumen 2010, Han Asparouh (Isperih) and Belasitsa. He has played football at the non-professional level, but also appeared in A PFG matches for PFC Shumen 2010.

References

1968 births
Living people
Bulgarian footballers
Bulgarian people of Turkish descent
First Professional Football League (Bulgaria) players
Association footballers not categorized by position